Ghar Bazar or Ghar Aur Bazar is a 1998 Hindi film starring Sharmila Tagore, Shekhar Suman and Mehmood, while Shashi Kapoor made a special appearance in the film. The film had its audio launch in 1986 but only released in 1998.

Cast
 Sharmila Tagore
 Natasha Shailendra
 Shekhar Suman
 Nilu Phule as Kishan Murari
 Gulshan Grover
 Mehmood
 Jankidas as Gupta
 Shashi Kapoor in a Special appearance

Soundtrack
The music of the film was composed by Usha Khanna, while lyrics were penned by Kulwant Jaani.

"Dil Ki Awaz Hai Main Teri Ho Gayi" - Asha Bhosle
"Main Dil Bech Doongi" - Kavita Krishnamurthy
"Main Tujh Se Teri Sab" - Mehmood
"Nach Kudiye Nigar Nach Kudiye" - Anuradha Paudwal, Mohammed Aziz
"Panditji Kya Soch Rahe Ho" - Shabbir Kumar, Usha Khanna

References

External links

Films scored by Usha Khanna
1998 films
1990s Hindi-language films